Grand Prix of Adygeya was a cycling race held between 2010 and 2015 in Russia, and was held as part of the UCI Europe Tour in category 2.2.

Winners

References

Cycle races in Russia
2010 establishments in Russia
Recurring sporting events established in 2010
UCI Europe Tour races
Recurring sporting events disestablished in 2015
2015 disestablishments in Russia
Defunct cycling races in Russia